Ctenusa pallida is a moth of the family Noctuidae. The species can be found in Botswana, Namibia, Nigeria, Zambia south to South Africa.

References 

Catocalinae
Moths described in 1902
Owlet moths of Africa